HTML5 Article is a HTML5 semantic element, similar to  and . It is most commonly used to contain information that may be distributed independently from the rest of the site or application it appears in.

Features and usage
The HTML5  element represents a complete composition in a web page or web application that is independently distributable or reusable, e.g. in syndication.  This could be a forum post, a magazine or newspaper article, a blog entry, a user-submitted comment, an interactive widget or gadget, or any other independent item of content.

Examples
At its most basic,  can be used to encapsulate a body of text and a corresponding title like so:
<article>
  <h2>Insert Title Here</h2>
  <p>Insert  a paragraph of text here</p>
</article>

Forum entries and comments are typically implemented by nesting  tags:
<article>
  <header>
    <h1>Entry Title</h1>
    <p>Header Info</p>
  </header>
  <p>Content of entry...</p>
  <article>
    <header>
      <h2>Author: John Smith</h2>
      <p>Comment Info</p>
    </header>
    <p>Comment text...</p>
  </article>
  <article>
    <header>
      <h2>Author: Jane Johnson</h2>
      <p>2nd Comment's Info</p>
    </header>
    <p>Comment text...</p>
  </article>
</article>

Attributes
The  element only includes the global HTML attributes such as contenteditable, id, and title. Note that pubdate applies only to the parent  element, or to the document as a whole.

Comparison with <section>

Nesting examples
To better organize independent content  tags can be nested inside  tags:
<article>
  <h2>Names of Shapes</h2>
  <p>There are several different types of shapes...</p>
  <section>
    <h4>Triangles</h4>
    <p>Here is some info about triangles</p>
  </section>
  <section>
    <h4>Circles</h4>
    <p>These Pi-shaped wonders are mesmerizing and...</p>
  </section>
</article>

Conversely, it may sometime be appropriate to nest an  element inside a  element. For example, in a web page containing several articles on varying subjects:
  <section>
    <h1>Articles about Paris Tourism</h1>
    <article>
      <h3>The Eiffel Tower</h3>
      <p>Standing at over 12 inches high...</p> 
    </article>
    <article>
      <h3>The Louvre</h3>
      <p>A must-see in Paris tourism...</p>
    </article>
  </section>

Browser support
The following browsers have support for this element:

Desktop
Google Chrome 5.0 and higher
Firefox 4.0 and higher
Internet Explorer 9.0 and higher
Safari 4.1 and higher
Opera 11.1 and higher
Mobile
Android 2.2 and higher
Firefox Mobile (Gecko) 4.0 and higher
IE Mobile 9.0 and higher
Safari Mobile 5.0 and higher
Opera Mobile 11.0 and higher

References

External links
Rich Snippet Wordpress Plugins

HTML5
Article